Be Our Guest Restaurant is a table service restaurant in Fantasyland at Magic Kingdom in the Walt Disney World Resort. The restaurant has the theme and appearance of the Beast's Castle from Disney's 1991 animated film Beauty and the Beast. The name of the restaurant is a reference to "Be Our Guest", one of the classic songs from that film.

History
The restaurant was added as part of a large expansion and renovation in 2012 to Fantasyland's phased opening.

In September 2009, it was announced at the D23 Expo that Fantasyland would be expanded to incorporate Disney Princess characters, along with a larger 3 ring circus-themed Dumbo area (now Storybook Circus). Recent conceptual artwork for the expansion shows several new additions and changes. Included is a new area themed to Disney's Beauty and the Beast featuring the Beast's Castle with a new dining experience, Gaston's tavern, and Belle's cottage. 

The restaurant was the only publicly accessible Magic Kingdom venue to serve wine and beer (exclusively at dinner) prior to December 23, 2016, when additional restaurants at Magic Kingdom added it to their menus.

On March 20, 2015, Be Our Guest Restaurant began to serve breakfast meals featuring foods such as eggs florentine and an open-faced egg and poached-bacon sandwich. Breakfast has since been discontinued in the post COVID-19 era with lunch and dinner being served in a table service setting and a limited Prix Fix menu available.

Restaurant

The castle features a full table service restaurant for lunch and dinner, requiring reservations.  Cuisine is French-inspired. There are three dining rooms are located within the castle, the Grand Ballroom where Belle and the Beast had their first dance, the (un)forbidden West Wing where the enchanted rose is kept on display, and the Rose Gallery with paintings and a 7' foot tall wooden music box depicting Belle and Beast dancing.

The Grand Ballroom features baroque windows reaching the ceiling showing an exact recreation of the same view that Belle and the Beast had of the enchanted forest.

The Rose Gallery has murals hand painted by Belle depicting the Enchanted Rose and many characters from the film, including the Beast, Mrs. Potts, Chip, Lumière, and Cogsworth.

The West Wing is the darkest room in the castle with the Enchanted Rose on display and an enchanted portrait of the Prince (before he became the beast) which may occasionally flash and show his now current Beast Form.

Area attractions

Enchanted Tales with Belle

Enchanted Tales with Belle reopened on February 19, 2023, after a three-year hiatus, as part of Walt Disney World's 50th Anniversary celebration and the Disney 100 Years of Wonder celebration.

It was announced that the Beast's Castle would be included as part of a meet-and-greet with Belle. The Storytime with Belle attraction which originally was located in the Fairytale Gardens is now performed in the library inside the Beast's Castle.

Guests could visit Belle's father's cottage, located at the former site of Ariel's Grotto. They can explore the home and encounter a magic mirror (a gift from the Beast) in Maurice's workshop which transports them to the Beast's Castle. Inside, they meet an audio-animatronic Madame Wardrobe who casts some guests as objects. Guests then head to the library and meet an audio-animatronic Lumiere who surprises a live Belle with guests and he will tell the classic story with help from her the selected guests. This attraction opened in December 2012.

Gaston's Tavern
Outside the castle and Belle's house is Gaston's tavern, another restaurant. It is themed to look like the tavern where Gaston sings his title song in the original film. The tavern features a portrait of Gaston over a large fireplace. Antlers and buckskins hang upon the wall, which is lined with barrels. Mugs and goblets can be purchased, but alcohol is not served. Gaston's serves up some of the most popular quick service dining snacks including their famous cinnamon roll. Instead, a non-alcoholic beverage has been created called "Lefou's Brew" which is an apple soda with a marshmallow foam topping, which looks like the beer served in Gaston's tavern in the film during the song.  Just outside is a water fountain of Gaston, holding barrels, with his foot on LeFou, holding mugs.

Bonjour Village Gift Shop
A gift shop inspired by the village where Belle lived in the film is also part of the area.

References

External links
Official Website

Beauty and the Beast (franchise)
Fantasyland
Magic Kingdom
Restaurants established in 2012
Walt Disney World restaurants
2012 establishments in Florida